T. Udhayasuriyan is an Indian politician and a Member of the Legislative Assembly of Tamil Nadu. He is member of the Dravida Munnetra Kazhagam party.

Udhayasuriyan was elected to the Tamil Nadu legislative assembly as a Dravida Munnetra Kazhagam (DMK) candidate from Chinnasalem constituency in the 1989 later he was disqualified by madras high court due to fake/altered age proof certificate to contest in election. and 2006 elections and from Sankarapuram constituency in the 1996 and 2016 elections.

Member of Legislative Assembly

2021-present
He represents the Sankarapuram Assembly constituency as Member of Legislative Assembly (MLA) in Tamil Nadu Assembly.  
Committee assignments of 16th Tamil Nadu Assembly
Chairman (2021-23) Committee on Government Assurances

References 

Dravida Munnetra Kazhagam politicians
Living people
Tamil Nadu MLAs 1996–2001
Tamil Nadu MLAs 2006–2011
Tamil Nadu MLAs 2016–2021
Year of birth missing (living people)
Tamil Nadu MLAs 2021–2026